Sylvain Marcel (born 1964) is a Canadian actor. Marcel is best known in French Canada for appearing in Familiprix television commercials since 2003, and in English Canada for his role in the hit film Bon Cop, Bad Cop as Luc Therrien. He has also appeared in various other films and television shows.

He was a César Award nominee for Best Supporting Actor at the 47th César Awards in 2022, for his performance in the film Aline.

Filmography

Film

Television

References

External links
 

1964 births
Living people
Canadian male film actors
Canadian male television actors
French Quebecers
Male actors from Quebec